Armentieux is a commune in the Gers department in southwestern France.

Geography 
Armentieux is located in the canton of Pardiac-Rivière-Basse and in the arrondissement of Mirande.

Population

See also
Communes of the Gers department

References

Communes of Gers